The Icaro Stratos is an Italian high-wing, single-place, rigid-wing hang glider that was designed by Icaro 2000 in conjunction with A-I-R GmbH and Felix Ruhle and produced by Icaro 2000, of Sangiano, circa 2003.

Design and development
The Stratos was a collaborative project between A-I-R GmbH and Icaro 2000. Following the launch of this model both companies pursued their own directions on rigid wing design, although they continued to collaborate on parts manufacture.

The aircraft is made from tubing, with the wing covered in Dacron sailcloth. The Stratos was built in two sizes to accommodate differing pilot weights, "L" and "M".

Operational history
The Laminar was used to win the World Hang Gliding Championships in 2002 in Class 5, Rigid Wing.

Angelo d'Arrigo flew a Stratos on the first flight over Mount Everest (8848 m), on 24 May 2004, setting an altitude record for hang gliders.

Variants
Stratos L
Large sized model for heavier pilots. Certified as DHV Class 3.
Stratos M
Small sized model for lighter pilots.

Aircraft on display
Museo Nazionale della Scienza e della Tecnologia "Leonardo da Vinci", Milan, Italy

Specifications (Stratos L)

References

Stratos
Hang gliders